The Slaughterman’s Daughter is the English-language title of Tikkun Ahar Hatzot (An After Midnight Prayer), an “epic historical adventure novel” written in a “fabulist style” about a Jewish community in a provincial Belarusian town which “takes the reader through the corridors of power, people and history of 19th century Belarus".

It was written by Israeli writer Yaniv Iczkovits in Hebrew and first published in Jerusalem in 2015. It was translated into English by Orr Scharf and first published as such in 2020.

Plot 
It is 1894, and many Jews are emigrating from the Russian Empire to the United States, Germany, and Palestine; the story is set in motion by one husband and father who abandons his family.

The townsfolk of Motal, a Belarusian town in the Pale of Settlement, are shocked when Fanny Keismann - devoted wife, mother of five, and celebrated cheese-maker - leaves her home and vanishes into the night. Such behavior was fairly common for men but never before had a woman done so. Fanny's reputation indicated she might be capable of unconventional deeds. Thus do the events of the story unfold.

Background
Motal is a small town in South-Western Belarus with a rich and tragic Jewish history. It is the birthplace of a number of famous Jews, including Chaim Weizmann, the first president of Israel.

The first records about the Jewish community go back to 17th century. According to the 1806 census, there were 152 Jews in Motal and by 1897 its Jewish population had climbed to 1,354 Jews, comprising 32% of the total population. The majority of Jews lived on small-scale trade and craft. Small industry started to develop in Motal at the end of the 19th century with the establishment of two candle workshops, three smithies, a mill, and butter factory. There were two synagogues in the town and a heder.

During World War II the area was occupied by Nazi forces that perpetrated mass executions of local Jews.

Development
When Iczkovits wrote The Slaughterman’s Daughter he didn’t want to visit Belarus – “ I wanted to sketch these lost worlds from my imagination and support the story with thorough historical research. I thought that if I travelled there, I would find a totally different world with no Jews, no Shtetls, just a standard Eastern European country with one Jewish museum and a desolate synagogue.” However, one month before the book was supposed to be printed in Israel, he decided he needed to do some fact-checking and travelled to Belarus.

He didn’t have high expectations for the journey knowing that the world today is entirely different from what it was in the 19th century. However, when he saw a boat on the Yaselda river “it perfectly matched [his] vision of Zizek’s boat” and Iczkovits realised that “maybe the old world and our world are not so very different” and that he was “not just following the protagonists of his book [but] might actually meet them”.

Publishing history

Translations
 Italian: Tikkun: o la vendetta di Mende Speismann per mano della sorella Fanny (2018) Vicenza: Neri Pozza. transl: Ofra Bannet
 Dutch: De slachtersdochter (2019) Amsterdam: De Geus. transl: Hilde Pach
 English: The Slaughterman's Daughter: a novel (American edition: 2021) New York: Schocken Books. transl: Orr Scharf 
 Polish: Córka rzeźnika (2021) Poznań: Wydawnictwo Poznańskie. transl: Anna Halbersztat
 Romanian: Fiica măcelarului (2022) HUMANITAS. transl: Ioana Petridean
 Serbian: Koljačeva kći (2022) Dereta Knjige
 Lithuanian: Skerdiko duktė (2022) BALTO leidybos namai. transl: Kristina Gudelytė-Lasman

Awards and nominations

Awards
 2015 Funding from the Israeli Ministry of Culture and Sport's  "People of the Book" award for translation of Hebrew literature into foreign languages, for The Slaughterman's Daughter" 
 2016 The Ramat Gan Prize for Literature awarded for "literary excellence in the original novel category" for The Slaughterman's Daughter
 2016 Inaugural award of the Agnon Prize for the Literary Arts, for The Slaughterman's Daughter
 2021 The Jewish Quarterly-Wingate Prize for The Slaughterman's Daughter

Shortlisted
 2017 The Slaughterman's Daughter: shortlisted for the Sapir Prize

Reviewers' notable mention for The Slaughterman's Daughter
 2020  The Economist - among the eight "Books of the Year" list  
2020  The Times - among the ten "Books of the Year" 
 2021 Kirkus Reviews - "One of the 10 fiction books to look forward to in 2021" 
 2021 Publishers Weekly - "Best Books"

The Slaughterman's Daughter reviewed by the major press
 2021 The Wall Street Journal - "Fiction: ‘In Memory of Memory’ Review" 
 2021 The New York Times - "Chasing Down a Deadbeat Dad, With a Knife Strapped to Her Leg"

References 

Israeli literature
Hebrew-language literature
Books about Belarus
Books about Jews and Judaism
2015 novels